This is a list of folk music traditions, with styles, dances, instruments and other related topics.  The term folk music can not be easily defined in a precise manner; it is used with widely varying definitions depending on the author, intended audience and context within a work.  Similarly, the term traditions in this context does not connote any strictly-defined criteria.  Music scholars, journalists, audiences, record industry individuals, politicians, nationalists and demagogues may often have occasion to address which fields of folk music are distinct traditions based along racial, geographic, linguistic, religious, tribal or ethnic lines, and all such peoples will likely use different criteria to decide what constitutes a "folk music tradition".  This list uses the same general categories used by mainstream, primarily English-language, scholarly sources, as determined by relevant statements of fact and the internal structure of works.

These traditions may coincide entirely, partially or not at all with geographic, political, linguistic or cultural boundaries.  Very few, if any, music scholars would claim that there are any folk music traditions that can be considered specific to a distinct group of people and with characteristics undiluted by contact with the music of other peoples; thus, the folk music traditions described herein overlap in varying degrees with each other.

The Caribbean music area includes all the islands of the Caribbean, including Cuba, Antigua and Barbuda, Montserrat, Saint Lucia, Virgin Islands, Puerto Rico, Dominican Republic, Haiti, Saint Kitts and Nevis, Saint Vincent and the Grenadines, Anguilla, Martinique, Dominica, Grenada, Guadeloupe and Trinidad and Tobago.  In addition, the mainland South American countries of Guyana, Suriname and French Guiana are generally grouped with the Caribbean countries, as is the non-Caribbean island nation of the Bahamas.  The island of Bermuda is not Caribbean, and its folk music is little studied; for convenience, it is included herein though it may or may not be typical of the Caribbean music area.

Notes

Sources 

 

F|Caribbean folk